The 66th Mobil 1 12 Hours of Sebring Presented by Advance Auto Parts was an endurance sports car racing event held at Sebring International Raceway near Sebring, Florida from 15 to 17 March 2018. The race was the second round of the 2018 WeatherTech SportsCar Championship, as well as the second round of the North American Endurance Cup.

The race was won by Tequila Patrón ESM's Nissan Onroak DPi driven by Pipo Derani, Johannes van Overbeek, and Nicolas Lapierre, ahead of the Cadillac DPi-V.R's of Wayne Taylor Racing and Whelen Engineering Racing. Porsche took GTLM honours with Nick Tandy, Frédéric Makowiecki, and Patrick Pilet behind the wheel of their 911 RSR. The GTD category was won by Paul Miller Racing's Corey Lewis, Bryan Sellers and Madison Snow in a GT3-spec Lamborghini Huracán.

Race

Results
Class winners are denoted in bold.

Statistics
 Pole Position - #90 Tristan Vautier - 1:47.432
 Fastest Lap - #8 Oliver Jarvis - 1:49.002 on lap 184

References

External links

12 Hours of Sebring
12 Hours of Sebring
12 Hours of Sebring
12 Hours of Sebring